Perseguidos, also known as El Capo, is a Mexican telenovela produced by Horacio Díaz Morales for Imagen Televisión together with TeleMéxico Studios. It is a remake of the Colombian series, El Capo. It stars Mauricio Islas as the titular character.

Plot 
The series presents José Vicente Solís Armenta, a delinquent who is prosecuted by the state, tried and condemned to the maximum penalty for crimes against humanity. By being betrayed, the authorities finally manage to track him down and want him dead or alive. Solis Armenta, as he escapes, has to deal with his wife whom he deceived, one of his lovers who seeks to assassinate him and a bodyguard who seems to succumb to his charms.

Cast

Main 
 Mauricio Islas as José Vicente Solís Armenta / El Capo
 Irán Castillo as Sofía Cáseres
 Marisol del Olmo as María Guadalupe Luján Flores
 Sara Maldonado as La Perris
 Miguel Rodarte as Pancho Solís Armenta
 Gerardo Taracena as Gustavo Benítez / Tavo
 Roberto Mateos as Hernán Molina
 Alejandro de la Madrid as Uribe
 Claudio Lafarga as Sergio Machado / Checo

Recurring 
 Mauricio Rousselon as Juan José "Jay" Solís
 Isabel Burr as Camila Solís
 Guillermo Quintanilla as General Payró
 Verónica Merchant as Irene
 Gustavo Sánchez Parra as Coronel Avilés
 Julio Bracho as Señor H
 Valentina Acosta as Connie
 Javier Díaz Dueñas as General Segovia
 Mimi Morales as Valeria Buenrostro
 Pablo Cruz Guerrero as Emiliano
 Ariane Pellicer as Doña Esperanza Armenta
 Eduardo Arroyuelo as Agente Barrales
 Mario Loría as Teniente Monroe
 Ricardo Polanco as Eduardo Solís Armenta
 Melissa Barrera as Laura Solis

Problems and broadcast 
The premiere of the series was scheduled for October 31, 2016. However, El Capo quickly came under a firestorm of criticism. The presidents of the Radio and Television Commissions in the Senate and Chamber of Deputies wrote a letter asking the RTC, Mexico's broadcast content regulator, and the Federal Telecommunications Institute to take action against Imagen Televisión, which aired the novela, for broadcasting a "narcoseries". The network may have feared that the program would receive a D rating from the RTC, in which case it could not air before midnight; days before the planned October 31 premiere, the title was changed to Perseguidos (Pursued) for its run on Imagen.

The series was broadcast from November 7, 2016 until January 27, 2017. In the United States the series premiered on April 4, 2017 in the timeslot of 10pm/9c with its original name, "El Capo". Due to the low rating of the series, Telemundo changed the schedule of the series to 8pm/7c.

U.S. broadcast 
The following is a list of episodes with titles and release dates in the United States, the ratings are also shown.

Notes

References 

2016 telenovelas
Mexican telenovelas
2016 Mexican television series debuts
2017 Mexican television series endings
Imagen Televisión telenovelas
Mexican television series based on Colombian television series
Works about Mexican drug cartels